Heikki Antinpoika Paasonen (2 January 1865 - 24 August 1919) was a Finnish linguist and ethnographer best known for his research in the linguistics and folklore of the Mokshas and the Erzyas during his two research trips to Russia. His studies include works on Chuvash, Mishar Tatar, Meadow Mari and Khanty languages, which led to further discoveries in Finno-Ugric and Turkic studies.

Biography
Paasonen was born in Mikkeli, the son of the merchants Anders Paasonen and Fredrika Matiskainen. He became a student at the Swedish-language lyceum in Mikkeli in 1881 and graduated with a bachelor's degree in philosophy in 1888 and worked from the following year until 1890 as a researcher with the Mokshas and Erzyas. The subject of his dissertation in 1893 was Mordvinic phonetics. In 1894, Paasonen became a Doctor of Primus and Docent of Finno-Ugric Linguistics. Paasonen made research trips to the Finno-Ugric peoples, including Hungary, collecting linguistic and ethnographic material. In 1902 he became the Chief Inspector of the School Board, and professor of Finno-Ugric linguistics at the University of Helsinki from 1904 to 1919.

Paasonen's research and collections were published quite extensively, even after his death. For example, the collection Mordwinische Volkslieder I-IV was published by Paavo Ravila from 1938 to 1947, and the Finno-Ugric Society has edited a dictionary of Mordvinic languages based on Paasonen's materials, which became the basis of lexicological research in these languages.

Family
Paasonen's spouse since 1894 was Hungarian-born Mariska Paskay de Palásth. Colonel Aladár Paasonen was their son. Their other children were Maria Aranka Gizela, Arvid and Ilona Anna. He died in Helsinki in 1919.

Works
Heikki Paasonen. Matkakertomus mordvalaisten maalta, SUSA XVII, 3. Helsinki 1890
Heikki Paasonen. Die Türkischen Lehnwörter im Mordwinischen. Helsingfors, 1897
Heikki Paasonen. Mordvinische Lautlehre. Helsingfors, Druckerei der Finnischen Litteraturgesellschaft, 1903
Heikki Paasonen. Die finnisch-ugrischen s-laute. Helsinki, Société finno-ougrienne, 1918
Heikki Paasonen. Beiträge zur Aufhellung der Frage nach der Urheimat der finnisch-ugrischen Völker. Turku, Turun Suomalaisen Yliopiston Kustantama, 1923
Heikki Paasonen; Kai Donner. Ostjakisches Wörterbuch, nach den Dialekten an der Konda und am Jugan. Helsingfors, Société finno-ougrienne, 1926
Heikki Paasonen. Mordvalaiset, Suomen suku II. Helsinki 1928
Heikki Paasonen; M E Evsevʹev; Mordwinische Volksdichtung. Helsinki, Suomalais-ugrilainen Seura, 1938-1981
Heikki Paasonen. H. Paasonens Ost-Tscheremissisches Wörterbuch. Helsinki, Suomalais-ugrilainen Seura, 1948
Heikki Paasonen. Eino Karahka; Martti Räsänen. Gebräuche und Volksdichtung der Tschuwassen. 	Helsinki, Suomalais-ugrilainen Seura, 1949.
Heikki Paasonen. Çuvaş sözlüğü. İstanbul : İbrahim Horoz Basımevi, 1950.
Heikki Paasonen. Mordwinische Chrestomathie mit Glossar und grammatikalischem Abriss. Helsinki, Suomalais-ugrilainen Seura, 1953
Heikki Paasonen. Eino Karahka. Mischärtatarische Volksdichtung. Helsinki, Suomalais-ugrilainen Seura, 1953
Heikki Paasonen; T Janurik. Tschuwaschisches Wörterverzeichnis. Szeged: Universitas Szegediensis de Attila József Nominata, 1974
Heikki Paasonen; Kaino Heikkilä; Paavo Ravila; Martti Kahla. Mordwinische Volksdichtung Bd. 5. Helsinki, Suomalais-Ugrilainen Seura 1977
Mordwinische Volksdichtung. Gesammelt von Ignatij Zorin, Durchgesehen u. transkribiert von Heikki Paasonen, übers. von Kaino Heikkilä u. Paavo Ravila, Herausgeg von Martti Kahla. V. Band. SUST 161. Helsinki 1977, Suomalais-Ugrilainen Seura.
Mordwinische Volksdichtung. Gesammelt on Ignatij Zorin, Durchgesehen u. transkribiert von Heikki Paasonen, übers. von Kaino Heikkilä u. Paavo Ravila, Herausgeg von Martti Kahla. VI. Band. SUST 162. Helsinki 1977, Suomalais-Ugrilainen Seura.
Heikki Paasonen. Edith Vértes. H. Paasonens südostjakische Textsammlungen. Helsinki, Suomalais-ugrilainen Seura, 1980
Heikki Paasonen; Kaino Heikkilä; Hans-Hermann Bartens; A P Feoktistov; G I Ermushkin; Martti Kahla. H. Paasonens Mordwinisches Wörterbuch. Helsinki, Suomalais-ugrilainen seura, 1990-1996
Heikki Paasonen; Edith Vértes. H. Paasonens surgutostjakische Textsammlungen am Jugan. Helsinki, Suomalais-Ugrilainen Seura, 2001

Literature
Федотов М. Р. Исследователи чувашского языка / М.Р. Федотов. — 2. изд., доп. — Чебоксары, 2000. —

Sources
Ilmari Heikinheimo: Biography of Finland. Helsinki: Werner Söderström Osakeyhtiö, 1955. Page 566.
Paasonen Helsingin yliopiston sivuilla
Heikki Paasonen on worldcat.org

References

External links
Heikki Paasonen in kansallisbiografia.fi
Heikki Paasonen. Big Soviet Encyclopedia. 1st edition, Volume 43, Moscow, 1926—1947
Энциклопедический словарь Брокгауза и Ефрона. ЭСБЕ. Россия, Санкт-Петербург, 1890—1907
National Library of Finland
Finno-Ugrian Society

See also
Finno-Ugrian Society

Finno-Ugrists
Finnish ethnologists
Turkologists
Academic staff of the University of Helsinki
People from the Grand Duchy of Finland
1865 births
1919 deaths